This is a list of the NCAA outdoor champions in the 3000 meters event.   The event was part of the program from the inception of women's events in 1982, until the event was removed from the program after the 2000 season.  In 2001, the 3000 meter steeplechase was introduced into the program.

Champions
Key
A=Altitude assisted

References

GBR Athletics

External links
NCAA Division I women's outdoor track and field

NCAA Women's Division I Outdoor Track and Field Championships
Outdoor track, women
3000 m